President of Palestine may refer to:
 Hajj Amin al-Husseini, President of the All-Palestine Government (1948–1959)
 President of the State of Palestine (1988–present)
 President of the Palestinian National Authority (1993–2012)

See also
 Chairman of the Palestine Liberation Organization